Banegi Apni Baat is an Indian television drama series that aired on Zee TV from 1993 running to 1997. The series was produced by Tony Singh and Deeya Singh.  It starred many Indian television actors, such as Irrfan Khan, Roshini Achreja, Shefali Chhaya, Firdaus Dadi, Sadiya Siddiqui, Anita Kanwal, Divya Seth, Achint Kaur, Rishabh, Varun Badola, Rakhee Tandon, Rituraj Singh and R. Madhavan.

The focus of the series was college life. Flirtation, romance, the campus. The transition from college to professional life was shown for most of the characters. Simultaneously, contemporary business life was also showcased.

Cast

Ikhlaq Khan as Som Khanna, Mr Seth's rival architect
Surekha Sikri as Radha Shourie
Irrfan Khan as Kumar Sharma, Revati's husband
Kalpana Iyer as Revati Sharma, fashion designer
Aman Khanna as Rajat
Shalini Suri as Shikha Rai 
R. Madhavan as Ashley Alexander
Roshini Achreja as Ritu, Radha' daughter, later Vikram Sharma's wife
Joan David/Shefali Chhaya as Richa, Radha' daughter
Firdaus Dadi as Riya, Radha' daughter, Ashley Alexander's love interest and wife in last episode
Arun Bali as Mr Seth
Raman Trikha as Rahul Seth
Sadiya Siddiqui as Priyanka Khanna, Rahul's wife and priyam's mother, Kabir's friend
Anita Kanwal as Amrita Seth
Alyy Khan as Kabir, a lawyer fighting Priyanka's case against Amrita
Achint Kaur as Anushka, Karan's sister
Divya Seth as Nikita Seth
Vikram Kapadia as D.K. Khanna
Girish Malik as Karan Nagpal, Richa's husband
Varun Badola as Ayushman
Rakhee Tandon as Shradha
 Rituraj Singh as Vikram (Vicky) Sharma , Revati - Kumar's son
Vipul Jagota as Duddoo
Kurush Deboo as E.T. 
Sandhya Mridul as Sakshi
Ashok Lokhande as Sabkale
Vipul Jagota as Dedoo 
Seema Pandey as tutor in last episode 
Vaquar Sheikh, Siddharth, Anushka 's love interest
 Manav Kaul

References

External links
 
 Banegi Apni Baat Streaming on ZEE5

Indian television soap operas
Zee TV original programming
1993 Indian television series debuts
1997 Indian television series endings
Indian teen drama television series